Lucky Di Unlucky Story is a 2013 Punjabi comedy film directed by Smeep Kang, and featuring Gippy Grewal, Jaswinder Bhalla, Gurpreet Ghuggi and Binnu Dhillon in lead roles; the group earlier came together for 2012 Punjabi comedy Carry On Jatta. The story is based on the lives of ladiesman Lucky; and his three married friends and how they enchance minor trouble. The film released on 26 April 2013. The core storyline was loosely based on the 2002 Tamil movie Panchathantiram which itself was inspired by the 1998 movie Very Bad Things.

Plot
Lucky (Gippy Grewal) falls in love with Seerat (Surveen Chawla) and the two later get engaged. Then, Lucky is taken on a vacation for his birthday by his three friends, Dimpy (Binnu Dhillon), Guri (Jaswinder Bhalla) and Jassi (Gurpret Ghuggi). A murder takes place and the four friends are the main suspects in their own eyes. They think the may have killed Sehffy (Sameksha). Then a funny sequence of events takes place and finally they find out the real killer and who the real victim was.

Cast
 Gippy Grewal as Lucky
 Jaswinder Bhalla as Guri Brar
 Gurpreet Ghuggi as Jassi
 Binnu Dhillon as Dimpy
 Surveen Chawla as Seerat
 Karamjit Anmol as Dimpy's brother in law
 Sameksha as Sheffy
 Roshan Prince as Sunny
 Jackie Shroff as Fateh

Soundtrack

References

External links
 

2013 black comedy films
2013 films
Punjabi-language Indian films
2010s Punjabi-language films
Films shot in Bangkok
Punjabi remakes of Tamil films
Indian slapstick comedy films
Films scored by Jatinder Shah
Indian black comedy films